The  (translated as Integrated Authority File, also known as the Universal Authority File) or GND is an international authority file for the organisation of personal names, subject headings and corporate bodies from catalogues. It is used mainly for documentation in libraries and increasingly also by archives and museums. The GND is managed by the German National Library (DNB) in cooperation with various regional library networks in German-speaking Europe and other partners. The GND falls under the Creative Commons Zero (CC0) licence.

The GND specification provides a hierarchy of high-level entities and sub-classes, useful in library classification, and an approach to unambiguous identification of single elements. It also comprises an ontology intended for knowledge representation in the semantic web, available in the RDF format.

The GND became operational in April 2012 and integrates the content of the following authority files, which have since been discontinued:
  (PND) (Translation: Name Authority File)
  (GKD) (Translation: Corporate Bodies Authority File)
  (SWD) (Translation: Subject Headings Authority File)
  (DMA-EST) (Translation: Uniform Title File of the German Music Archive)

It is referred to by identifiers named GND-ID.

At the time of its introduction on 5 April 2012, the GND held 9,493,860 files, including 2,650,000 personalised names.

Types of GND high-level entities

There are six main types of GND entities:

See also
 
 LIBRIS
 Virtual International Authority File (VIAF)

References

External links

 Information pages about the GND from the German National Library
 Search via OGND
 Bereitstellung des ersten GND-Grundbestandes  DNB, 19 April 2012
 From Authority Control to Linked Authority Data Presentation given by Reinhold Heuvelmann (German National Library) to the ALA MARC Formats Interest Group, June 2012

Computer-related introductions in 2012
Library cataloging and classification
Unique identifiers
Creative Commons-licensed databases